The 2021 Clemson Tigers women's soccer team represented Clemson University during the 2021 NCAA Division I women's soccer season.  The Tigers were led by head coach Ed Radwanski, in his eleventh season.  The Tigers home games were played at Riggs Field.  This was the team's 28th season playing organized soccer.  All of those seasons were played in the Atlantic Coast Conference.

The Tigers finished the season 12–7–1 and 6–3–1 in ACC play to finish in fifth place.  As the fifth seed in the ACC Tournament, they defeated Notre Dame before falling to Virginia in the Semifinals.  They earned an at-large bid to the NCAA Tournament, where they lost to Alabama in the First Round to end their season.

Previous season

Due to the COVID-19 pandemic, the ACC played a reduced schedule in 2020 and the NCAA Tournament was postponed to 2021.  The ACC did not play a spring league schedule, but did allow teams to play non-conference games that would count toward their 2020 record in the lead up to the NCAA Tournament.

The Tigers finished the fall season 6–4–0, 5–3–0 in ACC play to finish in fourth place.  As the fourth seed in the ACC Tournament, they lost to Duke 1–0 in the Quarterfinals.  The Tigers finished the spring season 6–0–0 and received an at-large bid as the fourteenth seed in the NCAA Tournament.  They defeated Rutgers and UCLA on penalties before losing to the eventual champions Santa Clara in the Quarterfinals to end their season.

Offseason

Departures

Recruiting Class

Squad

Roster

Team management

Source:

Schedule

Source:

|-
!colspan=6 style=""| Exhibition

|-
!colspan=6 style=""| Non-Conference Regular Season

|-
!colspan=6 style=""| ACC Regular Season

|-
!colspan=6 style=""| ACC Tournament

|-
!colspan=6 style=""| NCAA Tournament

Goals Record

Disciplinary record

Awards and honors

Rankings

2022 NWSL Draft

Source:

References

External links

Clemson
2021
Clemson Women's Soccer
Clemson
Clemson